Ayr was a county constituency of the House of Commons of the Parliament of the United Kingdom from 1950 to 2005. It elected one Member of Parliament (MP) by the first-past-the-post system of election.

Boundaries 
The constituency was created by merging the Ayr burgh and Prestwick burgh components of the Ayr District of Burghs constituency with parts of the South Ayrshire and Kilmarnock constituencies.

1950 to 1974: The civil parishes of Ayr, Prestwick, Tarbolton and Symington.

1974 to 1983: The civil parishes of Ayr (except rural area around Ayr Hospital), Prestwick, Tarbolton and Symington.

1983 to 1997: The towns of Ayr (except the council estate of Kincaidston), Prestwick and Troon plus the villages of Dundonald, Loans, Monkton, Tarbolton and Symington.

1997 to 2005: The 1995 South Ayrshire electoral wards of Dundonald; East Kyle; Fort; Lochside and Craigie; Heathfield; Kingscase; Newton; Seafield; St Cuthbert's; St Nicholas; Troon Central; Troon East; Troon West; Wallacetown and Whitletts, covering Dundonald, Loans, Monkton, Prestwick, Symington, Tarbolton, Troon and the north and west of Ayr. This change led to a substantial alteration in the demographic of the constituency with the Labour Party being the prime beneficiaries.

2005 onwards: In 2005 the constituency was divided between the Central Ayrshire and Ayr, Carrick and Cumnock constituencies. This had a significant impact on the Conservative party by dividing their support in Ayr, Prestwick and Troon into two separate, predominantly Labour-voting constituencies, neither of which attained any considerable level of support for the Conservatives to match that of the Labour party. The town of Ayr joined two-thirds of the former Carrick, Cumnock and Doon Valley constituency to form Ayr, Carrick and Cumnock, with the remaining portion of the former Ayr constituency (based in Prestwick, Troon, Dundonald and Loans) joining Irvine, Annbank, Auchincruive, east Kilwinning and the remainder of Kyle to form Central Ayrshire.

At the 2017 general election Conservative candidate Bill Grant gained the Ayr, Carrick and Cumnock constituency with a 2,774 vote majority over the SNP's Corri Wilson.

At the Scottish Parliament the Ayr constituency has existed since the creation of the Scottish Parliament in 1999. The constituency retained the same boundaries as that of the former Ayr constituency at Westminster (1997-2005) until the 2011 First Periodic Review of Scottish Parliament Boundaries. The constituency is currently composed of the electoral wards of Ayr West, Ayr East, Ayr North, Prestwick and Troon, covering the towns of Ayr, Prestwick and Troon. The constituency has been represented by Conservative MSP John Scott since a by-election in 2000.

Constituency profile and voting patterns

Members of Parliament

Election results

Elections in the 1950s

Elections in the 1960s

Elections in the 1970s

Elections in the 1980s

In 1987 Ayr became the most marginal Westminster constituency in Scotland and the fourth most marginal constituency in the United Kingdom, being won by Conservative George Younger by 182 votes.

Elections in the 1990s
In 1992 Ayr remained the most marginal constituency in Scotland and fourth most marginal constituency in the United Kingdom, being won by Conservative Phil Gallie with a majority of 85 votes. 

In 1997 the boundaries of the Ayr seat were altered. Below is the notional result from the 1992 general election using the 1997 boundaries.

Elections in the 2000s

References

South Ayrshire
Historic parliamentary constituencies in Scotland (Westminster)
Constituencies of the Parliament of the United Kingdom established in 1950
Constituencies of the Parliament of the United Kingdom disestablished in 2005
Ayr